The 1926 Brooklyn Robins season was the 18th and final season for long–time team star Zack Wheat.

Offseason 
 October 6, 1925: Zack Taylor, Jimmy Johnston and Eddie Brown were traded by the Robins to the Boston Braves for Jesse Barnes, Mickey O'Neil and Gus Felix.
 January 1926: Chick Fewster was purchased by the Robins from the Cleveland Indians.

Regular season

Season standings

Record vs. opponents

Game log 

|- style=
| 1 || April 13 || New Yorks Giants || 3–0 || Petty || ||  || 45,000||
|- style="text-align:center; background:#fbb;"
| 2 || April 14 || New Yorks Giants || 5–9 || Ring || ||  || ||
|- style="text-align:center; background:#fbb;"
| 3|| April 16 || New Yorks Giants || 2–3 || Scott || ||  || ||
|- style="text-align:center; background:#fbb;"
| 4|| April 17 || Phillies ||3–15 || Mitchell || ||  ||10,000 ||
|- style="text-align:center; background:#fbb;"
| 5|| April 18 || Phillies || 2–1 || Petty || ||  || 25,000 ||
|- style="text-align:center; background:#bfb;"
| 6|| April 19 || Phillies || || McGraw || ||  || 2,000 ||
|- style="text-align:center; background:#fbb;"
| 7|| April 22 || New Yorks Giants || ||  || ||  || 26,000 ||
|- style="text-align:center; background:#fbb;"
| 8|| April 23 || New Yorks Giants || || || ||  || 7,000 ||
|- style="text-align:center; background:#bfb;"
| 9|| April 24 || New Yorks Giants || 2–1 || || ||  || ||
|- style="text-align:center; background:#bfb;"
| 10|| April 25 || New Yorks Giants|| || 8–6 || ||  || 20,000 ||
|- style="text-align:center; background:#bfb;"
| 11|| April 27 || || 6–5 || || ||  || ||
|- style="text-align:center; background:#bfb;"
| 12|| April 28 || || 5–4 || || ||  || ||
|- style="text-align:center; background:#bfb;"
| 13|| April 28 || || 3–1 || || ||  || ||
|- style="text-align:center; background:#bfb;"
| 14|| April 30 || || 8–4 ||  || ||  || ||
|-

|-  bgcolor="ffbbbb"
|- align="text-align:center; background:#fbb;"
| 15 || May 1 || Phillies || || || || || ||
|- align=
| 16 || May 2 || Boston Braves || || || || || ||
|- align=
| 17 || May 3 || Boston Braves || || || || || ||
|- align=
| 18 || May 4 || Boston Braves || || || || || ||
|- align=
| 19 || May 6 || || || || || || ||
|-

Notable transactions 
 June 15, 1926: Sam Bohne was purchased by the Robins from the Cincinnati Reds.

Roster

Player stats

Batting

Starters by position 
Note: Pos = Position; G = Games played; AB = At bats; H = Hits; Avg. = Batting average; HR = Home runs; RBI = Runs batted in

Other batters 
Note: G = Games played; AB = At bats; H = Hits; Avg. = Batting average; HR = Home runs; RBI = Runs batted in

Pitching

Starting pitchers 
Note: G = Games pitched; IP = Innings pitched; W = Wins; L = Losses; ERA = Earned run average; SO = Strikeouts

Other pitchers 
Note: G = Games pitched; IP = Innings pitched; W = Wins; L = Losses; ERA = Earned run average; SO = Strikeouts

Relief pitchers 
Note: G = Games pitched; W = Wins; L = Losses; SV = Saves; ERA = Earned run average; SO = Strikeouts

References

External links
Baseball-Reference season page
Baseball Almanac season page

1926 Brooklyn Robins uniform
Brooklyn Dodgers reference site
Acme Dodgers page 
Retrosheet

Los Angeles Dodgers seasons
Brooklyn Robins season
Brooklyn
1920s in Brooklyn
Flatbush, Brooklyn